Siloam is a town in Greene County, Georgia, United States. The population was 282 at the 2010 census, down from 331 in 2000.

History
Siloam was originally called "Smyrna", and under the latter name permanent settlement was first made in the 1840s. A post office called Siloam was established in 1871. The present name is after the ancient Siloam tunnel, a place mentioned in the Hebrew Bible.

Geography
Siloam is located in eastern Greene County at  (33.535691, -83.080443). Georgia State Route 15 passes through the town as Main Street, leading northwest  to Greensboro, the county seat, and south  to White Plains. State Route 77 leads north from the center of town  to Union Point. Interstate 20 passes through the northern side of town, with access from Exit 138 (State Route 77). I-20 leads east  to Augusta and west  to Atlanta.

Demographics

As of the census of 2000, there were 331 people, 121 households, and 78 families residing in the town. The racial makeup of the town was 25.38% White, 73.11% African American, 0.60% Asian, 0.91% from other races. Hispanic or Latino of any race were 2.42% of the population.

There were 121 households, out of which 25.6% had children under the age of 18 living with them, 28.1% were married couples living together, 29.8% had a female householder with no husband present, and 35.5% were non-families. 28.9% of all households were made up of individuals, and 17.4% had someone living alone who was 65 years of age or older.  The average household size was 2.74 and the average family size was 3.38.

In the town, the population was spread out, with 27.2% under the age of 18, 11.2% from 18 to 24, 22.1% from 25 to 44, 23.6% from 45 to 64, and 16.0% who were 65 years of age or older.  The median age was 38 years. For every 100 females, there were 79.9 males.  For every 100 females age 18 and over, there were 79.9 males.

The median income for a household in the town was $23,125, and the median income for a family was $24,792. Males had a median income of $21,250 versus $19,821 for females.

Education
Nathanael Greene Academy (private)

References

External links

 Bethany Presbyterian Church historical marker

Towns in Greene County, Georgia
Towns in Georgia (U.S. state)